The NSL Cup also known officially as National Soccer League Cup was an annual knockout football competition in men's domestic Australian soccer organised by the Australian Soccer Federation between 1977 and 1997.

History
The NSL Cup was organised to run in conjunction with the teams participating in the National Soccer League (NSL) between 1977 and 1997. It was the second nationwide club tournament held in Australia, the first being the Australia Cup during the 1960s. It was held initially in 1977 immediately after the end of the NSL's regular home and away season, as there was no final series. The 1978 edition expanded to include teams from various state leagues in Australia, including Annerley (Queensland), West Woden Juventus (ACT), Essendon Croatia (Victoria), Sydney Croatia (NSW) and Ascot (WA).

For the 1993–94 season the Cup was played in the preseason, before being played as a mid-season break for the 1995–96 season and then returning to the preseason for the 1996–97 season. The 1996-97 Cup was the final cup to be playing during the NSL years and saw a brand new club, Collingwood Warriors, defeat Marconi in the final. A replacement national knock-out cup was not instigated until the FFA Cup in 2014.

Upsets 
State League side Sydney Croatia upset NSL club Marconi in the first round of the 1978 Cup. Other upsets over the years where state league teams defeated NSL teams, including Parramatta Melita Eagles defeating Marconi in 1979, Mt Gravatt defeating Brisbane City in 1980, and Croydon City defeating South Melbourne in 1986.

Records and statistics

Final

Team
Most wins: 3:
Adelaide City (1979, 1989, 1992)
Most consecutive wins: 2:
Brisbane City (1977, 1978)
Most appearances in a final: 5:
Heidelberg United (1980, 1982, 1983, 1993, 1995)
Most Final appearances without ever winning: 2, joint record:
Preston Lions (1985, 1991)
West Adelaide (1981, 1986)
Most Final appearances without ever losing: 2, joint record:
APIA Leichhardt (1982, 1988)
Brisbane City (1977, 1978)
Longest gap between wins 17 years, Marconi Stallions (1980–1997)
Biggest win 6 goals:
Melbourne Knights 6–0 Heidelberg United, (1995)
Most goals in a final 6:
Melbourne Knights 6–0 Heidelberg United, (1995)
Most goals by a losing side 2:
Sydney City 2–3 West Adelaide, (1986)
Most defeats 3, joint record:
Heidelberg United (1980, 1982, 1983)
Marconi-Fairfield (1977, 1992, 1997)

Winners and finalists

Results by team

References

 
National association football cups
Soccer cup competitions in Australia
Recurring sporting events established in 1977
Recurring sporting events disestablished in 1997
1977 establishments in Australia
1997 disestablishments in Australia